Andraya Carter is an analyst and reporter for ESPN/SEC Network coverage of college basketball, college football, and the WNBA and is a co-host for Out of Pocket with Alyssa Lang. Carter is also a former player of Tennessee Lady Volunteers Basketball.

Early life and playing career
Carter was born in Flowery Branch, Georgia. She went to school and played basketball at Buford High School (Georgia) playing for the legendary coach Gene Durden who also taught her multimedia presentations class. She was one of the driving forces behind three straight Class 2A state championships for the Lady Wolves (2009–2011) averaging 13 points per game in those seasons. She ended up missing her senior season due to injuries. Despite this, she was still ranked the No. 21 prospect nationally by espnW.com for the class of 2012 and accepted a scholarship to play the University of Tennessee Women's Basketball Team. She was a fan of the Lady Vols and coach Pat Summitt prior to joining them. She was one of the last players to sign with Summitt. Carter played five games in the 2012–13 season before being redshirted due to injury. She was named to the SEC All-Freshmen Team for 2013–14 season and led the conference in steals with 80 in the 2014–15 season. Mounting injuries forced her to retire after her redshirt junior season in 2015–16 ending her dreams of playing in the WNBA. Carter averaged 6.4 points per game and got 199 steals in her Vol Career.

Broadcasting career
In 2016 after ending her basketball career, she was looking for what to do after basketball when she was approached on campus by “The Vol For Life” production team about calling Tennessee basketball games online for ESPN3. Carter was given some games the following season which lead to a seasonal contract. She attended LaChina Robinson's media boot camp for women. She also covered the NBA G League as an analyst
 and worked as an instructor for Orange Theory (fitness center). In 2022, she was named a sideline reporter for SEC Network's coverage for College Football.

References

External links 

American sports journalists
American women television journalists
ESPN people
21st-century American journalists
21st-century American women
Sports commentators
Tennessee Lady Volunteers basketball players
Year of birth missing (living people)
Living people